Katherine Fletcher (born 18 February 1976) is a British Conservative Party politician who serves as the Member of Parliament (MP) for South Ribble in Lancashire, following the 2019 general election. She served as Parliamentary Under-Secretary of State in the Department for Transport and  Minister for Women between September and October 2022.

Early life and career
Katherine Fletcher was born in 1976 in Northenden, before moving to Bowdon in Cheshire, England.

Fletcher attended Royal Green Infants School in Northenden, St Wilfreds Junior School and then the selective Altrincham Grammar School for Girls in Bowdon, Greater Manchester. She studied biology at University of Nottingham, during which time she worked as a nursing assistant in an elderly care home. Before her election, Fletcher worked in banking and assisted in the early setup of the Northern Powerhouse. At the time of the election, Fletcher was a small and medium enterprise (SME) business owner  and a town councillor on Knutsford Town Council. Fletcher resigned from the Town Council in April 2020.

Parliamentary career
Fletcher stood as the Conservative Party's candidate in Ellesmere Port and Neston at the 2015 general election. She came second in the election to the Labour MP Justin Madders. She was elected as Member of Parliament (MP) for South Ribble at the 2019 general election. Her predecessor was fellow Conservative Seema Kennedy, who retired. Fletcher has said the A&E department at the Chorley and South Ribble Hospital should be restored to a 24-hour service.

As of March 2020, Fletcher holds Membership of two Parliamentary Committees: the Science and Technology Select Committee and the Petitions Committee.

Personal life
Fletcher qualified as safari ranger (field guide) during a gap year in Mpumalanga in Limpopo province, South Africa, and Mozambique. Away from politics, she enjoys palaeontology and holds a season ticket at Manchester United.

References

External links
 
 Biography

1976 births
Living people
UK MPs 2019–present
Conservative Party (UK) MPs for English constituencies
Female members of the Parliament of the United Kingdom for English constituencies
21st-century British women politicians
People from Knutsford
People from Wythenshawe
Politicians from Manchester
Alumni of the University of Nottingham
Conservative Party (UK) councillors
Councillors in Cheshire
Members of the Parliament of the United Kingdom for constituencies in Lancashire
21st-century English women
21st-century English people
Women councillors in England
Women's ministers of the United Kingdom